Andranomena Special Reserve is a wildlife reserve in Menabe Region, western Madagascar, near the city of Morondava and the rural commune of Bemanonga.

Geography
There is no overnight accommodation within the park.

Flora and fauna
Habitats on the reserve consist mainly of dry scrubland, deciduous dry forest with the vegetation dominated by the plant families, Bombacaceae, Burseraceae and Euphorbiaceae. Some of the species include Adansonia rubrostipa, commonly known as fony baobab, the ebony tree (Diospyros platycalyx), Euphorbia antso and Hazomalania voyronii which has timber that contains camphor an insect repellent. There are also small seasonal lakes with locally endemic aquatic plants.

Ten species of mammal have been recorded on the reserve including eight species of lemur, 48 bird species, eleven species of reptile and one amphibian. Coquerel's sifaka (Propithecus coquereli) was previously found at this site but has since been extirpated. Mammals found on the reserve include Madame Berthe's mouse lemur (Microcebus berthae), which is evaluated as an endangered species by the International Union for Conservation of Nature (IUCN) and is the smallest species of mouse lemur; an endangered species, Pale fork-marked lemur (Phaner pallescens); red-tailed sportive lemur (Lepilemur ruficaudatus) also vulnerable; and the Fossa (Cryptoprocta ferox), a cat-like, carnivore and also a vulnerable species.

Threats
The reserve is threatened by poaching, illegal felling of trees and slash-and-burn agriculture.

See also
 List of national parks of Madagascar

References

External links
 Madagascar National Parcs – Andranomena Reserve

Menabe
Special reserves of Madagascar
IUCN Category IV
Madagascar succulent woodlands